Marzouk may refer to:

Ahmed Fayez Bin Marzouk Al-Dosari (born 1985), Saudi Arabian long jumper
Marzouk Al-Ghanem (born 1968), current speaker of the Kuwaiti National Assembly
Abdul Aziz Al-Marzouk (born 1975), Saudi Arabian footballer
Marzouk Al-Otaibi (born 1975), Saudi Arabian former footballer
Abdul Marzouk Al-Yoha (born 1968), Kuwaiti athlete
Marzouk Mabrouk, Libyan Olympic middle-distance runner
Ahmed Fayaz Bin Marzouk (born 1979), Saudi Arabian long jumper
Essam Marzouk refugee from Pakistan to Vancouver, Canada in 1993
Faisal Marzouk, Kuwaiti swimmer
Faraj Saad Marzouk (born 1961), Qatari sprinter
Ghazi Saleh Marzouk (born 1951), Saudi Arabian athlete
Mohsen Marzouk (born 1965), Tunisian politician
Mongi Marzouk (born 1961), Tunisian politician
Moshe Marzouk (8206–1955), Egyptian Karaite Jew, hanged in 1955 for bombings in Cairo
Moussa Abu Marzouk (born 1951), Palestinian senior member of Hamas
Rafika Marzouk (born 1979), Tunisian handball player
Rashid Sheban Marzouk (born 1967), Qatari sprinter
Saleh Marzouk (born 1962), Kuwaiti swimmer
Tarik Marzouk, Moroccan footballer
Younes Bnou Marzouk (born 1996), French-born Moroccan footballer

See also
Marzouki
Marzuki
Merzouga
Murzik
Murzuk